The National Historic Landmarks in Alaska represent Alaska's history from its Russian heritage to its statehood. There are 50 National Historic Landmarks (NHLs) in the state. The United States National Historic Landmark program is operated under the auspices of the National Park Service, and recognizes structures, districts, objects, and similar resources according to a list of criteria of national significance. Major themes include Alaska's ancient cultures, Russian heritage, and role in World War II, but other stories are represented as well. In addition, two sites in Alaska were designated National Historic Landmarks, but the designation was later withdrawn. These sites appear in a separate table further below.

The National Historic Landmark Program is administered by the National Park Service, a branch of the Department of the Interior. The National Park Service determines which properties meet NHL criteria and makes nomination recommendations after an owner notification process. The Secretary of the Interior reviews nominations and, based on a set of predetermined criteria, makes a decision on NHL designation or a determination of eligibility for designation. Both public and privately owned properties can be designated as NHLs. This designation provides indirect, partial protection of the historic integrity of the properties via tax incentives, grants, monitoring of threats, and other means. Owners may object to the nomination of the property as a NHL. When this is the case the Secretary of the Interior can only designate a site as eligible for designation.

NHLs in Alaska
The table below lists all of the National Historic Landmark sites, along with added detail and description.

|}

Historic areas of the NPS in Alaska
National Historic Sites, National Historical Parks, some National Monuments, and certain other areas listed in the National Park System are historic landmarks of national importance that are highly protected already, often before the inauguration of the NHL program in 1960, and are then often not also named NHLs per se.  There are three of these in Alaska.  The National Park Service lists these three together with the NHLs in the state,

Cape Krusenstern National Monument is also an NHL and is listed above.  The other two are:

Former NHLs in Alaska

See also
National Register of Historic Places listings in Alaska
History of Alaska
Historic preservation
National Register of Historic Places
List of U.S. National Historic Landmarks by state

Notes

References

External links
 National Historic Landmark Program at the National Park Service
 Lists of National Historic Landmarks

Alaska
Landmarks

National Historic Landmarks